Alluru is located in Krishna district of Andhra Pradesh, India.

References 

Villages in Krishna district